The Mexican National Women's Tag Team Championship (Spanish: Campeonato Nacional Femenil de Parejas) is a Mexican national tag team professional wrestling championship that is run exclusively for female wrestlers. The championship is sanctioned and controlled by the Comisión de Box y Lucha Libre México D.F. (Mexico City Boxing and Wrestling Commission), and is currently promoted by Consejo Mundial de Lucha Libre (CMLL). Because it is a professional wrestling championship, the winner of the Mexican National Women's Tag Team Championship is decided by a scripted ending to a match rather that by actual competition.

The championship was introduced in mid-1990; the mother/daughter team of Irma González and Irma Aguilar defeated Neftali and Satanakia in the finals of a tournament to determine the inaugural champions. Five teams held the championship between 1991 and 1997, when it was abandoned. No team held the championship more than twice but La Briosa held it with two different partners; Vicky Carranza and Neftali. The last championship team was La Rosa and La Sirenita, who won it on January 19, 1996, and defended their title until 1997. On March 4, 2020, CMLL announced that it would revive the championship.

History
In 1990, the Comisión de Box y Lucha Libre México D.F. (Mexico City Boxing and Wrestling Commission) created and sanctioned the Mexican National Women's Tag Team Championship (Campeonato Nacional de Parejas Femenil). Unlike the majority of the Mexican National Championships at the time, this was not controlled by Consejo Mundial de Lucha Libre (CMLL) but was promoted on the Mexican independent circuit. Records are unclear on which teams participated in the tournament to crown the first champions but state the mother/daughter team Irma González and Irma Aguilar defeated Neftali and Satanakia on April 10, 1990, in a show in Xochimilico, Mexico City, to become the inaugural winners. Their reign lasted for 619 days, although it is unclear how many championship defenses the team made during the time, if any.

On December 20, 1991, Martha Villalobos and Pantera Sureña won the championship in an independent-circuit show in Mexico City. No records for championship defenses between December 1991 and February 19, 1994, have been found but it is recorded Vicky Carrenza and La Briosa won the championship on that date to become the third champions. During the subsequent 46 days, Carrenza and Briosa disbanded the team, leaving the championship vacant. The Commission allowed both women to select a new tag-team partner to contest the vacant championship. La Briosa and Neftali defeated Vicki Carranza and La Medusa to claim the championship in a show promoted by AAA. This was the first time the championship was promoted by AAA, one of Mexico's largest, national wrestling companies. The titles were next defended in AAA 653 days later as La Rosa and La Sierenita defeated Briosa and Neftali by count-out on January 19, 1996, and the championship changed hands. By 1997, the championship stopped being promoted and neither champion ever referred to the title or wore the championship belts to the ring.

Reigns
The current champions are La Jarochita and Lluvia. Five teams consisting of nine individuals held the championship between 1990 and 1997. La Briosa is the only person to have held the championship twice so far, having won it with Vicky Carrenza and Neftali. Briosa and Carrenza's reign lasted 46 days before the team broke up and the championship was vacated; it is the shortest reign so far. Martha Villalobos' and Pantera Sureña's -day reign from December 20, 1991 until February 19, 1994, is the longest in the history of the championship.

Rules
As with all professional wrestling championships, matches for the Mexican National Women's Tag Team Championship were won by a pre-planned ending whose outcome is determined by bookers and match makers rather that through actual competition. Occasionally a promotion declared the championship vacant, meaning there was no title holder at that time. This was either due to a storyline, or real-life issues such as an injured champion being unable to defend the championship, or leaving the company. All title matches take place under two-out-of-three falls rules.

Officially, only Mexican citizens may either challenge for or hold the Mexican National Women's Tag Team Championship although exceptions exist, such as the Puerto Rican Zeuxis winning the Mexican National Women's Championship. As is the case for all the Mexican National titles, the championship may generally not be defended in any type of match other than a regular tag-team-match format. The Comisión de Box y Lucha Libre México D.F. has enforced the rules inconsistently; in one case they stripped Psicosis of the Mexican National Middleweight Championship for defending it in a hardcore match. In another case, it allowed the Mexican National Heavyweight Championship to change hands in a steel cage match.

Title history

Tournaments

2020

On its March 4, 2020 Informa show, CMLL announced it was re-introducing the Mexican National Women's Tag Team Championship and would hold a tag-team tournament over three Sunday shows between March 15 and 29, 2020, as part of CMLL's Sunday Arena México show. It was originally planned for March to coincide with Women's History Month. The tournament will consist of ten teams, split into two qualifying blocks. For each block all five teams will participate in a battle royal where the winning team will move to the semifinal, while the other four teams will be required to compete against each other. Due to the COVID-19 pandemic, the tournament was postponed. In September, CMLL announced that the tournament would start on October 5 as part of their weekly CMLL Super Viernes shows.

Block A
La Comandante and La Seductora
La Magnifica and Silueta
Marcela and Skadi
Reyna Isis and Tiffany
La Amapola and La Metálica

Block B
Princesa Sugehit and Sanely
Dalys and Stephanie Vaquer
Estrellita and Mystique
La Vaquerita and La Guerrera
La Jarochita and Lluvia

Tournament brackets

Tournament results
October 5 Super Viernes (Block A)

October 9 Super Viernes (Block B)

Footnotes

References

Women's professional wrestling tag team championships
Mexican national wrestling championships
National professional wrestling championships